Huitfeldt is a Norwegian and Danish surname. Notable people with the surname include:

 Anniken Huitfeldt (born 1969), Norwegian politician representing the Norwegian Labour Party, appointed Minister of Foreign Affairs in 2021
 Arild Huitfeldt (1546–1609), Danish historian and state official
 Hans L. C. Huitfeldt (1876–1969), Norwegian physician
 Ivar Huitfeldt (1665-1710), Norwegian naval hero during the Great Northern War
 Margareta Huitfeldt (1608-1683), Norwegian-Swedish noble, estate owner and donor
 Povel Huitfeldt (1520-1592), Danish-Norwegian Governor-general of Norway

See also
 Huitfeldt (noble family), Danish family linked to Danneskiold-Samsøe
 Ivar Huitfeldt class frigate

Danish-language surnames
Norwegian-language surnames